Rivellia interrupta is a species of tephritid or fruit flies in the genus Rivellia of the family Tephritidae.

References

interrupta
Insects described in 1835